Ted's Place is a gas station in Larimer County, Colorado, United States.

In May, 1922, Ted Herring opened a filling station and store at the intersection of US 287 and Colorado State Highway 14. The popular stop near the canyon was quickly named 'Ted's Place' by local residents. After Herring's death in 1963, the property had various owners and as of 2016 is owned by Shell.

There are "a number of log cabins built by forgotten pioneers" to the south.

References

External links

Unincorporated communities in Larimer County, Colorado
Unincorporated communities in Colorado